José María Morales is a Spanish film producer and founder of Madrid-based film distributor Wanda Films in 1992. 

He produced La Teta Asustada (The Milk of Sorrow), which won the Golden Bear at the 59th Berlin International Film Festival and was nominated for the Academy Award for Best Foreign Language Film in 2010. He was a member of the jury at the 60th Berlin International Film Festival.

References

External links

1954 births
Living people
Spanish film producers